This is a list of glaciers in Asia.

List of glaciers

China
 Angsi Glacier- Tibet
 Bayi Glacier - Qinghai
 Hailogou Galicer - SiChuan
 July 1 Glacier - GanSu
 Kangshung Glacier- Tibet
 Laigou Galicer - Tibet
 Midui Galicer - Tibet
 Mingyong Glacier - Yunnan
 Muzart Glacier - Xinjiang
 Purog Kangri Glacier - Tibet
 Puruogangri - Tibet
 Rongbuk Glacier - Tibet
 Sarpo Laggo Glacier - Xinjiang
 Teram Kangri Glacier - Xinjiang
 Touming Mengke Glacier - GanSu
 Urumqi Glacier No.1 - Xinjiang
 Yinsugaiti Glacier - Xinjiang

Indonesia
Carstensz Glacier
West Northwall Firn
East Northwall Firn

All three are on Puncak Jaya. The Meren Glacier on the summit disappeared at some time between 1992 and 2000.

India
List of glaciers of India

Japan

Nagano Prefecture
 Kakunesato Glacier, Mount Kashimayari

Toyama Prefecture
 Gozenzawa Glacier, Mount Tate
 Kuranosuke Glacier, Mount Tate
 Komado Glacier, Mount Tsurugi
 Sannomado Glacier, Mount Tsurugi
 Ikenotan  Glacier, Mount Tsurugi

Kazakhstan
Gorodetsky Glacier

Kyrgyzstan
Engilchek Glacier
Sarychat glacier

Mongolia

Bayan-Ölgii Province
Potanin Glacier

Nepal
Hunku Glacier
Imja Glacier
Khumbu Glacier

Pakistan
Abruzzi Glacier
Baltoro Glacier 
Batura Glacier
Biafo Glacier
Biarchedi Glacier
Bilafond Glacier in the Siachen area claimed by both Pakistan and India.
Godwin-Austen Glacier
Gondogoro Glacier
Hainablak Glacier
Hispar Glacier
Hussaini Glacier
Hoper Glacier
Lonak Glacier
Miar Glacier
Panmah Glacier
Passu Glacier
Rupal Glacier
Sachiokuh Glacier
Sarpo Laggo Glacier
Shaigri Glacier
Shandar Glacier
Shani Glacier
Shireen Maidan Glacier
Shishpar Glacier
Shuijerab Glacier
Shutwerth Glacier
Silkiang Glacier
Sim Glacier
Siru Glacier
Skora La Glacier
Sokha Glacier
South Barum Glacier
Sovoia Glacier
Stokpa Lungma Glacier
Sumayar Bar Glacier
Tarashing Glacier
Thalo Glacier
Thui Glacier
Toltar Glacier
Toshain Glacier
Trango Glacier
Trivor Glacier
Tsarak Tsa Glacier
Udren Glacier
Uli Biaho Glacier
Ultar Glacier
Upper Khurdopin Glacier
Upper Tirich Glacier
Vigne Glacier
West Vigne Glacier
Wyeen Glacier
Yermanendu Glacier
Yazghill Glacier
Yishkuk Glacier
Yukshgoz Glacier
Zindikharam Glacier

Tajikistan
Fedchenko Glacier
Russian Geographical Society Glacier

See also
List of glaciers

References

 
Glaciers
Asia